Ervedosa may refer to the following places in Portugal:

 Ervedosa (Pinhel), a civil parish in the Pinhel Municipality
 Ervedosa (Vinhais), a civil parish in the municipality of Vinhais 
 Ervedosa do Douro, a civil parish in the municipality of São João da Pesqueira